Diomedes Panton (born 20 October 1960) is a Filipino former cyclist. He competed in the individual pursuit event at the 1984 Summer Olympics. Panton also won the gold medal at the Men's 4 km. individual pursuit in track racing at the Southeast Asian Games, beating fellow Filipino cyclist, Renato Mier, at the Kabataang Barangay Velodrome.

References

External links
 

1960 births
Living people
Filipino male cyclists
Olympic cyclists of the Philippines
Cyclists at the 1984 Summer Olympics
Place of birth missing (living people)
Asian Games medalists in cycling
Cyclists at the 1982 Asian Games
Asian Games bronze medalists for the Philippines
Medalists at the 1982 Asian Games
Southeast Asian Games medalists in cycling
Southeast Asian Games gold medalists for the Philippines
Competitors at the 1981 Southeast Asian Games